Isnit is a city in Qalyubia Governorate, Egypt.

Populated places in Qalyubiyya Governorate